Bukovica is a village in the lower Vipava Valley in the Municipality of Renče–Vogrsko in the Littoral region of Slovenia.

Name
Bukovica is a common toponym and oronym in Slovenia, and in South Slav areas in general. It is derived from the adjective bukov 'beech' (from bukev 'beech tree') and originally referred to the local vegetation. The Italian name of the settlement was Boccavizza.

Notable monuments
The parish church in the settlement is dedicated to Saint Lawrence and was rebuilt in 1928 after the old church in a slightly different location in the village was destroyed in the First World War. It belongs to the Koper Diocese.

The village has a World War I military cemetery, with the remains of the Austro-Hungarian soldiers who fought on this section of the front during the Battles of the Isonzo. The soldiers buried in Bukovica fought in the 24th Infantry Regiment (K. u. K. Infanterieregiment "Ritter von Kummer" No. 24) from Kolomyia, then known as Kolomea, in present-day Ukraine.

Notable people
Notable people that were born or lived in Bukovica include:
Zoran Mušič, painter (1909–2005)
Karel Bonutti, Slovenian-American scholar and diplomat (born 1928)

References

External links 
Bukovica on Geopedia

Populated places in the Municipality of Renče-Vogrsko